Geisser is a surname. Notable people with the surname include:

 Seymour Geisser (1929 – 2004), American statistician
 Thomas Geisser (born 1966), German mathematician 
 Tobias Geisser (born 1999), Swiss professional ice hockey defenseman 
 Vincent Geisser (born 1968), French sociologist and political scientist
 Walter Geisser (born 1950), Swiss former footballer
 Wilhelm Geisser (1889 –1964), Swiss footballer